Kiss of Death may refer to:

 Kiss of Judas, Judas's betrayal of Jesus with a kiss identifying him to his executioners
 Kiss of death (mafia), a Mafia signal that someone has been marked for execution

Film and television 
 Kiss of Death (1916 film), a Swedish silent film directed by Victor Sjöström
 Kiss of Death (1947 film), a film directed by Henry Hathaway
 The Kiss of Death (1973 film), a film featuring Chen Ping
 Kiss of Death (1977 film), a made-for-TV film directed by Mike Leigh 
 Kiss of Death (1995 film), a remake of the 1947 film, directed by Barbet Schroeder
 Kiss of Death (2008 film), a 2008 UK crime drama television film
 Kiss of Death (audio drama), a 2011 audio play based on the TV series Doctor Who
 "Kiss of Death" (Get Smart), an episode of Get Smart
 "Kiss of Death" (That '70s Show), an episode of That '70s Show

Literature 
 The Kiss of Death (novel), a 2008 novel by Marcus Sedgwick
 Kiss of Death, a young-adult novel by Malcolm Rose
 Kiss of Death, the eighth novel in The Morganville Vampires series by Rachel Caine

Music

Albums 
 Kiss of Death (Jadakiss album), 2004
 Kiss of Death (Motörhead album), 2006
 Kiss of Death, by IC3PEAK, 2022
 Kiss of Death, by Untoten, 1997

Songs 
 "Kiss of Death" (song), by Mika Nakashima, the opening theme from the anime series Darling in the Franxx
 "Kiss of Death", by Anvil from Strength of Steel
 "Kiss of Death", by Alec Empire from Futurist
 "Kiss of Death", by Black Sabbath from Forbidden
 "Kiss of Death", by Dokken from Back for the Attack
 "Kiss of Death", by Glamour of the Kill from Glamour of the Kill
 "Kiss of Death", by Jassie Gift from the Rain Rain Come Again soundtrack
 "Kiss of Death", by New Order, the B-side of the single "The Perfect Kiss"
 "Kiss of Death", by Split Lip Rayfield from Never Make It Home

Other uses 
 Kiss of death (firearm), a handgun hidden in lipstick, used by the KGB
 The Kiss of Death (sculpture), a 1930 marble sculpture in Poblenou Cemetery, Barcelona
 The Kiss of Death (1957), a photograph of Linda Christian and Alfonso de Portago
 "Kiss of Death", a game-winning shot made by Mario Elie during the 1995 NBA Playoffs
 Kiss-o'-Death, a network packet used to counteract NTP server misuse and abuse

See also
 Kiss of the Death, a 2008 Vietnamese film